Kotelnikovsky District is an administrative district (raion), one of the thirty-three in Volgograd Oblast, Russia. As a municipal division, it is incorporated as Kotelnikovsky Municipal District. It is located in the south of the oblast. Its administrative center is the town of Kotelnikovo. Population:  36,856 (2002 Census);  The population of Kotelnikovo accounts for 54.4% of the district's total population.

Notable people 
 Vasily Generalov (1867-1887) a Russian revolutionary
 Germogen (Maximov) (1861-1945) head of the Croatian Orthodox Church, 1942–1945.
 Yemelyan Pugachev (ca.1742–1775) an ataman of the Yaik Cossacks and disaffected ex-lieutenant of the Imperial Russian Army who led Pugachev's Rebellion in 1773-75.
 Alina Stremous (born 1995) a Russian-born Moldovan biathlete who competed at the 2022 Winter Olympics

References

Notes

Sources

Districts of Volgograd Oblast